Kentropyx vanzoi, also known commonly as Gallagher's kentropyx, is a species lizard in the family Teiidae. The species is endemic to South America.

Etymology
The specific name, vanzoi, is in honor of Brazilian herpetologist Paulo Vanzolini.

Geographic range
K. vanzoi is found in Bolivia (Santa Cruz Department) and Brazil (Mato Grosso state).

Reproduction
K. vanzoi is oviparous.

References

Further reading
Gallagher DS, Dixon JR (1980). "A New Lizard (Sauria: Teiidae: Kentropyx) from Brasil". Copeia 1980 (4): 616–620. (Kentropyx vanzoi, new species).

vanzoi
Reptiles described in 1980
Taxa named by Daniel Stephen Gallagher, Jr.
Taxa named by James R. Dixon